Elachista chelonitis is a moth of the family Elachistidae. It is found in South Africa, Kenya and Malawi.

References

chelonitis
Moths described in 1909
Moths of Africa